Quinoline methiodide is a quaternary ammonium compound produced by reaction of quinoline with methyl iodide. It has paralyzing effects.

See also
Quaternary ammonium compound

References

Quinolines
Quaternary ammonium compounds
Iodides